Thomas Lang (born 1967) is an Austrian drummer.

Thomas Lang may also refer to:
 Thomas Lang (author) (born 1967), German writer, winner of the 2005 Ingeborg Bachmann Prize
 Thomas Lang (singer), English singer-songwriter
 Thomas Lang (cricketer) (1854–1902), English cricketer
 Tommy Lang (footballer, born 1906) (1906–?), Scottish footballer
 Tommy Lang (footballer, born 1956), Irish-American footballer
 Tommy Lang (Australian footballer) (1890–1970), Australian rules footballer
 Tom Lang (born 1997), footballer
 Thomas Lang, a fictional character, protagonist of the novel The Gun Seller by Hugh Laurie

See also
Thomas Lange (disambiguation)